Chaouki Sammari (born 20 March 1972) is a Tunisian wrestler. He competed in the men's freestyle 48 kg at the 1992 Summer Olympics.

References

1972 births
Living people
Tunisian male sport wrestlers
Olympic wrestlers of Tunisia
Wrestlers at the 1992 Summer Olympics
Place of birth missing (living people)
20th-century Tunisian people